In economics, an input–output model is a quantitative economic model that represents the interdependencies between different sectors of a national economy or different regional economies. Wassily Leontief (1906–1999) is credited with developing this type of analysis and earned the Nobel Prize in Economics for his development of this model.

Origins
Francois Quesnay had developed a cruder version of this technique called Tableau économique, and Léon Walras's work Elements of Pure Economics on general equilibrium theory also was a forerunner and made a generalization of Leontief's seminal concept.

Alexander Bogdanov has been credited with originating the concept in a report delivered to the All Russia Conference on the Scientific Organisation of Labour and Production Processes, in January 1921. This approach was also developed by L. N. Kritsman and T. F. Remington, who has argued that their work provided a link between Quesnay's tableau économique and the subsequent contributions by Vladimir Groman and Vladimir Bazarov to Gosplan's method of material balance planning.

Wassily Leontief's work in the input–output model was influenced by the works of the classical economists Karl Marx and Jean Charles Léonard de Sismondi. Karl Marx's economics provided an early outline involving a set of tables where the economy consisted of two interlinked departments.

Leontief was the first to use a matrix representation of a national (or regional) economy.

Basic derivation 
The model depicts inter-industry relationships within an economy, showing how output from one industrial sector may become an input to another industrial sector. In the inter-industry matrix, column entries typically represent inputs to an industrial sector, while row entries represent outputs from a given sector. This format, therefore, shows how dependent each sector is on every other sector, both as a customer of outputs from other sectors and as a supplier of inputs. Sectors may also depend internally on a portion of their own production as delineated by the entries of the matrix diagonal. Each column of the input–output matrix shows the monetary value of inputs to each sector and each row represents the value of each sector's outputs.

Say that we have an economy with  sectors. Each sector produces  units of a single homogeneous good. Assume that the th sector, in order to produce 1 unit, must use  units from sector . Furthermore, assume that each sector sells some of its output to other sectors (intermediate output) and some of its output to consumers (final output, or final demand). Call final demand in the th sector . Then we might write

or total output equals intermediate output plus final output. If we let  be the matrix of coefficients ,  be the vector of total output, and  be the vector of final demand, then our expression for the economy becomes

which after re-writing becomes . If the matrix  is invertible then this is a linear system of equations with a unique solution, and so given some final demand vector the required output can be found. Furthermore, if the principal minors of the matrix  are all positive (known as the Hawkins–Simon condition), the required output vector  is non-negative.

Example 

Consider an economy with two goods, A and B. The matrix of coefficients and the final demand is given by

Intuitively, this corresponds to finding the amount of output each sector should produce given that we want 7 units of good A and 4 units of good B. Then solving the system of linear equations derived above gives us

Further research 

There is extensive literature on these models. There is the Hawkins–Simon condition on producibility. There has been research on disaggregation to clustered inter-industry flows, and on the study of constellations of industries. A great deal of empirical work has been done to identify coefficients, and data has been published for the national economy as well as for regions. The Leontief system can be extended to a model of general equilibrium; it offers a method of decomposing work done at a macro level.

Regional multipliers 
While national input–output tables are commonly created by countries' statistics agencies, officially published regional input–output tables are rare. Therefore, economists often use location quotients to create regional multipliers starting from national data. This technique has been criticized because there are several location quotient regionalization techniques, and none are universally superior across all use-cases.

Introducing transportation 

Transportation is implicit in the notion of inter-industry flows. It is explicitly recognized when transportation is identified as an industry – how much is purchased from transportation in order to produce. But this is not very satisfactory because transportation requirements differ, depending on industry locations and capacity constraints on regional production. Also, the receiver of goods generally pays freight cost, and often transportation data are lost because transportation costs are treated as part of the cost of the goods.

Walter Isard and his student, Leon Moses, were quick to see the spatial economy and transportation implications of input–output, and began work in this area in the 1950s developing a concept of interregional input–output. Take a one region versus the world case. We wish to know something about inter-regional commodity flows, so introduce a column into the table headed "exports" and we introduce an "import" row.

A more satisfactory way to proceed would be to tie regions together at the industry level. That is, we could identify both intra-region inter-industry transactions and inter-region inter-industry transactions. The problem here is that the table grows quickly.

Input–output is conceptually simple. Its extension to a model of equilibrium in the national economy has been done successfully using high-quality data. One who wishes to work with input–output systems must deal with industry classification, data estimation, and inverting very large, often ill-conditioned matrices. The quality of the data and matrices of the input-output model can be improved by modelling activities with digital twins and solving the problem of optimizing management decisions. Moreover, changes in relative prices are not readily handled by this modelling approach alone. Input–output accounts are part and parcel to a more flexible form of modelling, computable general equilibrium models.

Two additional difficulties are of interest in transportation work. There is the question of substituting one input for another, and there is the question about the stability of coefficients as production increases or decreases. These are intertwined questions. They have to do with the nature of regional production functions.

Technology Assumptions
To construct input-output tables from supply and use tables, four principle assumptions can be applied. The choice depends on whether product-by-product or industry-by-industry input-output tables are to be established.

Usefulness

Because the input–output model is fundamentally linear in nature, it lends itself to rapid computation as well as flexibility in computing the effects of changes in demand. Input–output models for different regions can also be linked together to investigate the effects of inter-regional trade, and additional columns can be added to the table to perform environmentally extended input–output analysis (EEIOA). For example, information on fossil fuel inputs to each sector can be used to investigate flows of embodied carbon within and between different economies.

The structure of the input–output model has been incorporated into national accounting in many developed countries, and as such can be used to calculate important measures such as national GDP. Input–output economics has been used to study regional economies within a nation, and as a tool for national and regional economic planning. A main use of input–output analysis is to measure the economic impacts of events as well as public investments or programs as shown by IMPLAN and Regional Input–Output Modeling System. It is also used to identify economically related industry clusters and also so-called "key" or "target" industries (industries that are most likely to enhance the internal coherence of a specified economy). By linking industrial output to satellite accounts articulating energy use, effluent production, space needs, and so on, input–output analysts have extended the approaches application to a wide variety of uses.

Input–output and socialist planning
The input–output model is one of the major conceptual models for a socialist planned economy. This model involves the direct determination of physical quantities to be produced in each industry, which are used to formulate a consistent economic plan of resource allocation. This method of planning is contrasted with price-directed Lange-model socialism and Soviet-style material balance planning.

In the economy of the Soviet Union, planning was conducted using the method of material balances up until the country's dissolution. The method of material balances was first developed in the 1930s during the Soviet Union's rapid industrialization drive. Input–output planning was never adopted because the material balance system had become entrenched in the Soviet economy, and input–output planning was shunned for ideological reasons. As a result, the benefits of consistent and detailed planning through input–output analysis were never realized in the Soviet-type economies.

Measuring input–output tables 

The mathematics of input–output economics is straightforward, but the data requirements are enormous because the expenditures and revenues of each branch of economic activity have to be represented. As a result, not all countries collect the required data and data quality varies, even though a set of standards for the data's collection has been set out by the United Nations through its System of National Accounts (SNA): the most recent standard is the 2008 SNA. Because the data collection and preparation process for the input–output accounts is necessarily labor and computer intensive, input–output tables are often published long after the year in which the data were collected—typically as much as 5–7 years after. Moreover, the economic "snapshot" that the benchmark version of the tables provides of the economy's cross-section is typically taken only once every few years, at best.

However, many developed countries estimate input–output accounts annually and with much greater recency. This is because while most uses of the input–output analysis focus on the matrix set of inter-industry exchanges, the actual focus of the analysis from the perspective of most national statistical agencies is the benchmarking of gross domestic product. Input–output tables therefore are an instrumental part of national accounts. As suggested above, the core input–output table reports only intermediate goods and services that are exchanged among industries. But an array of row vectors, typically aligned at the bottom of this matrix, record non-industrial inputs by industry like payments for labor; indirect business taxes; dividends, interest, and rents; capital consumption allowances (depreciation); other property-type income (like profits); and purchases from foreign suppliers (imports). At a national level, although excluding the imports, when summed this is called "gross product originating" or "gross domestic product by industry." Another array of column vectors is called "final demand" or "gross product consumed." This displays columns of spending by households, governments, changes in industry stocks, and industries on investment, as well as net exports. (See also Gross domestic product.) In any case, by employing the results of an economic census which asks for the sales, payrolls, and material/equipment/service input of each establishment, statistical agencies back into estimates of industry-level profits and investments using the input–output matrix as a sort of double-accounting framework.

Input–output analysis versus consistency analysis
Despite the clear ability of the input–output model to depict and analyze the dependence of one industry or sector on another, Leontief and others never managed to introduce the full spectrum of dependency relations in a market economy. In 2003, Mohammad Gani, a pupil of Leontief, introduced consistency analysis in his book Foundations of Economic Science, which formally looks exactly like the input–output table but explores the dependency relations in terms of payments and intermediation relations. Consistency analysis explores the consistency of plans of buyers and sellers by decomposing the input–output table into four matrices, each for a different kind of means of payment. It integrates micro and macroeconomics into one model and deals with money in a value-free manner. It deals with the flow of funds via the movement of goods.

See also 

 Anthropogenic metabolism
 Computable general equilibrium
 Economic base analysis
 Economic planning
 EIOLCA
 Environmentally extended input–output analysis
 Gross output
 Linear programming
 Industrial metabolism
 Industrial organization
 IPO model
 Material balance planning
 Material flow analysis
 Net output
 Shift-share analysis
 Social metabolism
 Socialist economics
 Urban metabolism

References 

ابونوری, اسمعیل, فرهادی, & عزیزاله. (2017). آزمون فروض تکنولوژی در محاسبه جدول داده ستانده متقارن ایران: یک رهیافت اقتصاد سنجی. پژوهشهای اقتصادی ایران, 21(69), 117–145.

Bibliography
 Dietzenbacher, Erik and Michael L. Lahr, eds. Wassily Leontief and Input–Output Economics. Cambridge University Press, 2004.
 Isard, Walter et al. Methods of Regional Analysis: An Introduction to Regional Science. MIT Press 1960.
 Isard, Walter and Thomas W. Langford. Regional Input–Output Study: Recollections, Reflections, and Diverse Notes on the Philadelphia Experience. The MIT Press. 1971.
 Lahr, Michael L. and Erik Dietzenbacher, eds. Input–Output Analysis: Frontiers and Extensions. Palgrave, 2001.
 Leontief, Wassily W. Input–Output Economics. 2nd ed., New York: Oxford University Press, 1986. 
 Miller, Ronald E. and Peter D. Blair. Input–Output Analysis: Foundations and Extensions. Prentice Hall, 1985. 
 Miller, Ronald E. and Peter D. Blair. Input–Output Analysis: Foundations and Extensions, 2nd edition. Cambridge University Press, 2009. 
 Miller, Ronald E., Karen R. Polenske, and Adam Z. Rose, eds. Frontiers of Input–Output Analysis. N.Y.: Oxford UP, 1989.[HB142 F76 1989/ Suzz]
 Miernyk, William H. The Elements of Input–Output Anaysis, 1965.Web Book-William H. Miernyk .
 Polenske, Karen. Advances in Input–Output Analysis. 1976. 
 Pokrovskii, Vladimir N. Econodynamics. The Theory of Social Production, Springer, Dordrecht, Heidelberg et cetera, 2011.
 ten Raa, Thijs. The Economics of Input–Output Analysis. Cambridge University Press, 2005.
 US Department of Commerce, Bureau of Economic Analysis . Regional multipliers: A user handbook for regional input–output modeling system (RIMS II). Third edition. Washington, D.C.: U.S. Government Printing Office. 1997.
Eurostat Eurostat manual of supply, use and input-output tables. Office for Official Publications of the European Communities, 2008.

External links
 International Input–Output Association
 Input–Output Accounts Data, Bureau of Economic Analysis 
 Input–Output Analysis and Related Methods , San José State University
 Doing Business project input/output tables for reforms
 Energy Economics. Input–Output Analysis: Lecture – 6 and Lecture 7 – two introductory videos on Input–Output methodology with a focus on energy economics from IIT Kharagpur.

Models 
 REMI (Regional Economic Models, Inc.) 
 IMPLAN (Impact Analysis for Planning)
 REDYN (Regional Dynamics Model)

Economics models
Economic planning
National accounts
Urban, rural, and regional economics
Regional science
Mathematical and quantitative methods (economics)
Russian inventions
Soviet inventions
American inventions